The GM TDH-4801 and TDM-4801 were a special series of GM "old-look" transit buses that were produced between 1953 and 1958 and which were designed to maintain a maximum rear axle weight load of no more than . Both models are 102 inches wide. The TDH-4801 was equipped with an automatic transmission and 547 were built between 1953 and 1958. The TDM-4801 was equipped with a manual transmission and 75 were built in 1954.

See also

GM "old-look" transit bus

References
Stauss, Ed (1988). The Bus World Encyclopedia of Buses, Woodland Hills, CA: Stauss Publications. 
McKane, John H. & Squier, Gerald L. (2006). Welcome Aboard the GM New Look Bus, Hudson, WI: Iconografix. 
Bail, Eli (1984). From Railway to Freeway - Pacific Electric and the Motor Coach, Glendale, CA: Interurban Press. 
Ohio Museum of Transportation, omot.org, retrieved on 2006-12-20

General Motors buses
Buses of the United States
Full-size buses
Single-deck buses
Vehicles introduced in 1953